Phiale elegans is a species of spiders of the jumping spider family, Salticidae.

It is found in Panama.

References

External links 
 Phiale elegans at the World Spider Catalog

Salticidae
Spiders of Central America
Spiders described in 1901